William Hauber (May 20, 1891 – July 17, 1929) was an American film actor.  He appeared in more than 60 films between 1913 and 1928. He was born in Brownsville, Minnesota, and died in California in a plane crash during aerial scouting for film locations during the production of the film The Aviator in 1929.

Selected filmography

 Kid Speed (1924)
 Her Boy Friend (1924)
 Trouble Brewing (1924)
 Lightning Love (1923)
 The Gown Shop (1923)
 The Midnight Cabaret (1923)
 The Barnyard (1923)
 The Counter Jumper (1922)
 The Agent (1922)
 Golf (1922)
 A Pair of Kings (1922)
 The Show (1922)
 The Sawmill (1922)
 The Bell Hop (1921)
 The Fall Guy (1921)
 The Rent Collector (1921)
 The Bakery (1921)
 The Stage Hand (1920)
 Dull Care (1919)
 Frauds and Frenzies (1918)
 Bears and Bad Men (1918)
 Huns and Hyphens (1918)
 Love, Loot and Crash (1915)
 Tillie's Punctured Romance (1914)
 Mabel at the Wheel (1914)
 A Flirt's Mistake (1914)
 Fatty's Flirtation (1913)
 Barney Oldfield's Race for a Life (1913)
 That Ragtime Band (1913)

References

External links
 
 

1891 births
1929 deaths
Burials at Forest Lawn Memorial Park (Glendale)
People from Brownsville, Minnesota
Male actors from Minnesota
American male film actors
American male silent film actors
Accidental deaths in California
20th-century American male actors
Victims of aviation accidents or incidents in 1929
Victims of aviation accidents or incidents in the United States